Eastport-South Manor is a school district that serves parts of both Brookhaven and Southampton towns in eastern Suffolk County, New York.  Commonly known as "ESM", the district serves the hamlets of Manorville and Eastport, as well as portions of the hamlets of Speonk and Mastic.

The total enrollment for the 2015-2016 school year is 3,534 students.

History of the district 

The school district was formed in 2000 from the merger of two local districts, Eastport Union Free School District (UFSD) in Eastport, and South Manor UFSD in Manorville.

These two districts, along with several others, participated in a study in the mid-1990s to determine the feasibility of combining the many local districts into one centralized district.  Proponents suggested that this would benefit the schools through lower central administration costs, and would allow significantly better programming for students, since a combined district would have a much higher enrollment than any of the individual districts.  Further, the area covered in the scope of the study had experienced significant growth, particularly in Manorville, which had doubled the population in a span of only ten years.  Finally, neither South Manor UFSD nor East Moriches UFSD (a nearby district that also participated in the study) had high schools of their own, and were paying costly tuition to send their students to other high schools.

Ultimately, only Eastport and South Manor decided to combine to create a new district.

The central administration office is located at 149 Dayton Avenue, Manorville, NY 11949.

Before the merger, Eastport's mascot was the Duck, paying tribute to the large local duck farming industry, due to which Eastport was commonly referred to as "the duck capital of the world". The mascot of the South Manor school district was the Mustang.

Schools in the district 
 South Street School (Grades K-2)
 Tuttle Avenue Elementary School (Grades K-2)
 Dayton Avenue School (Grades 3-6)
 Eastport Elementary School (Grades 3 - 6)
 Eastport-South Manor Junior/Senior High School (Grades 7-12)

Before the two school districts merged, South Street School and Dayton Avenue School were the two schools of South Manor UFSD, serving grades K-9.  Eastport Elementary was known as Eastport High School, but served all thirteen grades in one building.  It was the only school in the former Eastport UFSD.

Extracurricular activities

Theatre 

The school district is known for its excellence in stage productions. The theater facilities include a black box theater capable of holding 250 audience members, a main stage theater with nearly 1000 seats, state-of-the-art lighting and sound equipment, a booth, a lighting catwalk, state of the art rigging system, costume building facilities, dressing rooms, an orchestra pit, and a scene shop. Several shows are put on in the Black Box stage. Two shows are put on a year on the Main Stage. While the shows are performed by students, the level of dedication from all members give students the impression they are working professionally. In the fall there is a “5 day play challenge”, and in the spring, a musical.

Many students have also received Teeny Awards in various categories for their performances. In addition, many students pursue careers and further education in theater, and some have even made it to Broadway.

Since opening in 2003 the following shows have been put on:

 Moon Over Buffalo
 Guys and Dolls
 The Laramie Project 
 Fiddler on the Roof
 Rumors
 Little Women
 The Crucible
 South Pacific
 Noises Off
 Les Miserables
 Picnic
 Anything Goes
 Lend Me a Tenor
 Beauty and The Beast
 West Side Story
 Inherit the Wind
 The Music Man 
 Blithe Spirit 
 The Sound Of Music
 The Diary of Anne Frank
 A Chorus Line
 The Last Night of Ballyhoo
 Little Shop of Horrors
 Crimes of the Heart
 Mary Poppins
 Sylvia
 Godspell
 The Little Mermaid
 Legally Blonde Canceled due to Covid-19
 Radium Girls
 The Addams Family

Sports 
The school is also known for its sports program. The school offers (most for both boys and girls): Lacrosse, Cross Country, Volleyball, Football, Wrestling, Basketball, Baseball, Softball, Track, Tennis, Soccer, Golf, Ice Hockey, Field Hockey, and Bowling.
 Eastport-South Manor teams are regularly recognized by Section XI for its top scholar-athletic teams, with many of the teams given the sportsmanship award.
 The gymnasium and football field at Eastport-South Manor are affectionately dubbed 'The Shark Tank'. The student section, also known as 'The Shark Pack', provides an incredible atmosphere at varsity games.
 In 2015 the Girls Varsity Lacrosse team were Class B state champions.
 In 2016, Boys Varsity Volleyball were Class B State Champions.
 In 2019, the girls varsity lacrosse team was the state Class B champion.
 In 2021, the Boys Varsity Volleyball team were the Class B State Champions. They went 20-0, only losing 1 set all year, including a streak of 56 in a row.  They will go down as one of the most dominant boys volleyball teams in the history of New York State.

Clubs

The Eastport-South Manor school district also provides its students with many extracurricular clubs and activities:

Stage Crew
Marching Band
Color Guard
Jazz Band
S.A.D.D. (Students Against Destructive Decisions)
Science Club
S.A.L.T (Students Aiding Living Things)
Yearbook Club
National Junior Honor Society
National Honor Society
World Language Honor Society
Student Council/Government
Key Club
Tri-M Music Honor Society
Varsity Leaders Club
Show Choir
Chess Club
Coding Club
Debate Club

Wall of Honor Project

From 2011-2013 at Eastport South Manor Junior-Senior High School, a committee of students, parents, teachers and administrators met to decide on an appropriate manner in which the community could honor the students that voluntarily enter the military upon their graduation from the high school. The ESM community decided to construct a Wall of Honor as a means to express their gratitude to the courageous alumni serving in the United States Armed Forces. This wall is designed to recognize graduates from the first graduation class (2004) to the present. The names of future graduates whom enter the military will also have their names added to the Wall of Honor. In order to support its construction, volunteers raised over $60,000.

References

External links 
Eastport-South Manor Central School District
Burton, Behrendt & Smith (BBS)

School districts in New York (state)
Brookhaven, New York
Southampton (town), New York
Education in Suffolk County, New York
School districts established in 2003